The South Wales Guardian is a newspaper serving Ammanford and the surrounding area of Carmarthenshire, Wales.

References

South Wales Guardian